The Byzantine–Venetian War of 1171 was fought between the Byzantine Empire and the Republic of Venice as a result of the Byzantine imprisonment of Venetian merchants and citizens across the Empire. 10,000 Venetians were imprisoned in the Byzantine capital, Constantinople, alone. Despite Doge Michiel's apparent will to pursue a peaceful solution, outrage in Venice itself swung popular opinion in the favour of full scale war against Byzantium. Doge Michiel had no choice but to set out for war, which he did in mid-late 1171.

Background

Course of the War

Aftermath
The disastrous defeat of Venice in this war was one of the greatest military blunders in the city-state's history, and permanently altered Venice's position on foreign affairs. A formal truce between the two empires would not be ratified until 1177, with minor skirmishes continuing until then.

References

Sources

See also
Byzantine–Venetian War (1296–1302)
Venetian–Genoese wars

1170s conflicts
1170s in the Byzantine Empire
Venetian 1171
Byzantine 1171
Medieval Greece
Byzantine Empire–Republic of Venice relations